Charles or Charlie Brown may refer to:

People

Arts and entertainment

Music
 Charlie Brown (singer) (born 1986), British singer
 Charlie Brown (born 1970), American rapper and member of Leaders of the New School
 Charles Brown (musician) (1922–1999), American blues singer

Other arts and entertainment
 Charlie Brown (DJ) (–2022), American radio DJ
 Charles Brockden Brown (1771–1810), American novelist
 Charles D. Brown (1887–1948), American stage and film actor
 Charles Brown (actor) (1946–2004), American actor with Negro Ensemble Company
 Charles Hopel Brown (born 1964), Jamaican writer

Military
 Charlie Brown of the Charlie Brown and Franz Stigler incident (1922–2008), American World War II pilot
 Charles Brown (Royal Navy officer) (c. 1678–1753), Royal Navy officer
 Charles Brown (Medal of Honor, 1864) (1841–1919), American Civil War Medal of Honor recipient
 Charles Brown (Medal of Honor, 1872) (1849–?), American 1871 Korean Expedition Marine and Medal of Honor recipient
 Charles Henry Brown (1872–1917), New Zealand Army officer who served during World War I
 Charles R. Brown (1899–1983), United States Navy four-star admiral
 Charles Q. Brown Jr. (born 1962), Chief of Staff of the United States Air Force
 Sir Charles Richmond Brown, 4th Baronet, British soldier

Politics

United States
 Charlie Brown (Georgia politician) (1903–1995), Atlanta politician for whom the airport Charlie Brown Field is named
 Charlie Brown (Indiana politician) (born 1938), Indiana State Representative
 Charlie Brown (West Virginia politician) (born 1950), West Virginia attorney general
 Charles Brown (congressman) (1797–1883), U.S. Representative from Pennsylvania
 Charles Brown (mayor) (1873–1943), mayor of Murray, Utah, 1906–1909
 Charles Brown (Wisconsin politician) (born 1828), Wisconsin state assemblyman
 Charles Elwood Brown (1834–1904), U.S. Representative from Ohio
 Charles Harrison Brown (1920–2003), U.S. Representative from Missouri
 Charles Henry Brown (politician) (1904–1959), Vermont lawyer and politician

Other countries
 Charles Brown (Australian politician) (1895–1970), Australian politician from Queensland
 Charles Brown (Labour politician) (1884–1940), British Labour Party Member of Parliament for Mansfield, 1929–1940
 Charles Brown (New Zealand politician) (1820–1901), from Taranaki
 Charles Hunter Brown (1825–1898), New Zealand politician from Canterbury

Religion
 Charles Arthur Brown (1919–1997), American Auxiliary Bishop of Santa Cruz, Bolivia
 Charles E. Brown Jr. (1911–1996), Chief of Chaplains of the U.S. Army
 Charles John Brown (born 1959), American Catholic Archbishop and Apostolic Nuncio to the Philippines
 Charles John Brown (moderator) (1806–1884), Scottish minister
 Charles Oliver Brown (1848–1941), Congregational Minister and bugler in the American Civil War
 Charles Reynolds Brown (1862–1950), American Congregational clergyman and educator
 Charles Rufus Brown (1849–1914), American Baptist clergyman and Semitic scholar

Sports

American football
 Charlie Brown (defensive back) (born 1942), National Football League and Canadian Football League player
 Charlie Brown (running back) (born 1945), National Football League player
 Charlie Brown (wide receiver, born 1948) (born 1948), National Football League player
 Charlie Brown (wide receiver, born 1958) (born 1958), National Football League player
 Charles Brown (offensive lineman) (born 1987), American football player
 Charles Edwin Brown (born 1936), American football offensive lineman
 Charles H. Brown (American football) (1886–1963), American college football player and coach, judge

Association football
 Charlie Brown (Australian footballer) (1896–1956), Australian rules footballer for Collingwood
 Charlie Brown (footballer, born 1873) (1873–1941), Australian rules footballer for Carlton
 Charlie Brown (footballer, born 1898) (1898–1979), English footballer with Southampton and Queens Park Rangers
 Charlie Brown (footballer, born 1999), English footballer with Milton Keynes Dons
 Charlie Brown (Scottish footballer) (1924–2019), Scottish footballer who played for Queen of the South

Other sports
 Charlie Brown (baseball) (1871–1938), American baseball player
 Charlie Brown Jr. (basketball) (born 1997), American professional basketball player
 Charlie Brown (basketball, born 1936), American college basketball player
 Charles Brown (boxer) (born 1939), American Olympic bronze medalist
 Charlie Brown (boxer) (born 1958), American boxer
 Charles Brown (cricketer, born 1815) (1815–1875), English cricketer
 Charles Brown (cricketer, born 1854) (1854–1917), Australian-born English cricketer
 Charles Brown (ice hockey) (born 1947), American ice hockey player
 Charles Brown (roque player) (1867–1937), American Olympic bronze medalist
 Charles Brown (rugby union, born 1887) (1887–1966), New Zealand rugby union player
 Charlie Brown (rugby union, born 1878) (1878–1944), South African international rugby union player
 Charles Brown (water polo), New Zealand water polo player

Science and engineering
 Charles Brown (British engineer) (1827–1905), British engineer
 Charles Barrington Brown (1839–1917), British-Canadian geologist and explorer
 Charles D. Brown II, American physicist
 Charles Eugene Lancelot Brown (1863–1924), Swiss engineer and founder of railway companies

Other people
 Charles Armitage Brown (1787–1842), British businessman, friend of poet John Keats
 Charles E. Brown (photographer) (1896–1982), British commercial aviation photographer
Charles F. Brown (1844–1929), American lawyer and judge
Charles H. Brown (New York judge) (1858–1933), American lawyer and judge
 Charles Harvey Brown (1875–1960), American librarian
 Charles N. Brown (1937–2009), American publisher, founder of magazine Locus
 Charles Philip Brown (1798–1884), British official of the East India Company
 Charles Stuart Brown (1918–1997), Wyoming Supreme Court judge

Songs
 "Charlie Brown" (The Coasters song), a 1959 hit song written by Leiber and Stoller
 "Charlie Brown", a 1974 song by Benito di Paula
 "Charlie Brown" (Coldplay song), a 2011 song from Coldplay's album Mylo Xyloto
 "Charlie Brown", a 2020 song from the album Fake It Flowers by Beabadoobee

Other uses
 Charlie Brown, Peanuts comic strip character
 You're a Good Man, Charlie Brown, the musical comedy based on the Peanuts comic strip
 Charlie Brown Jr., a Brazilian rock band (1993–2013)
 Charles E. Brown Middle School, Newton, Massachusetts, United States

See also
 Chuck Brown (disambiguation)
 Charlie Brown's (disambiguation)
 Charles Browne (disambiguation)
 Carlos Brown (disambiguation)
 Charles Wreford-Brown (1866–1951), British footballer